City Montessori School, Rajajipuram (CMS RJPM) Branch, Lucknow is a private school that offers education up to the level of under-graduation, in Lucknow, India. CMS Rajajipuram Campus 1 is a co-educational, English Medium institution affiliated to ICSE Board, New Delhi. The chain of schools was established by Dr. Jagdish Gandhi and his wife Mrs. Bharti Gandhi. The school houses many contemporary facilities, including a fully functional physics, chemistry, biology, computer and biotechnology laboratory. For extra-curricular activities, City Montessori School provides facilities like swimming pool, basketball court, auditorium and tennis court for students.

Organization 
CMS Rajajipuram Campus 1 comprises four sections:

The Pre-Primary Section 
CMS has adopted the Montessori method of preschool education. The Pre-Primary section admits boys and girls between the ages of 2 and 5 as follows:
 Montessori: 2 to 3 years of age (Play Group)
 Nursery: 4 years of age
 Kindergarten: 5 years of age

The Primary Section 
The Primary Section consists of Grades I-VI.

The Junior Section 
The Junior Section consists of Grades VI-VIII.

The Senior Section 
The Senior Section consists of Grades IX-XII

Traditions

Morning prayer assembly 
Students participate in morning assembly, held in the school's auditorium and lasting about half an hour. It consists of the recital of devotional songs and prayers. A group of students conducts the assembly and presents virtue-talks and inspiring speeches and stories as well. There are discussions on how to bring about world peace.

Class presentations 
Class presentations showcase individual talent. Every child of the class gets an opportunity to face an audience in a 2-2½ hour long ensemble of dances, songs, cultural presentations, skits and debates.

Enrichment classes 
With the aim of adapting the curriculum to individual needs the school runs enrichment classes. These are held after school hours and consist of small groups where discussion, problem-solving, reinforcement of learning and close teacher student interaction takes place.

Student Council 
To develop leadership qualities and a sense of responsibility in children the school has a head boy/head girl, captains, vice captains and prefects who are responsible for discipline, neatness and organization of functions.

 2016-2017
 Head Boy : Tushar Pandey
 Head Girl : Firdaus Fatima
 Sports Captain : Shivam Ronaldo
 Sports Captain : Tushar Rawat

Extracurricular activities 
CMS RJPM students participate in National and International competitions including International Robotics Olympiads, International Quality Circle Conventions, International Astronomy Olympiads, Environmental workshops, International Science festivals like Quanta, Macfair, Cofas, Celesta, SAARC Youth Festival, World Peace Festival, Children's International Summer Village (CISV) Camps, International School to School Exchange (ISSE) programmes, National Mathematics Olympiads, National Talent Search Examination and National Choral Singing Competitions.

References

External links 
 
 http://www.cmseducation.org
 Website of City Montessori School (CMS) founder Dr. Jagdish Gandhi
 Campus Here

Montessori schools in India
Primary schools in Uttar Pradesh
High schools and secondary schools in Uttar Pradesh
Private schools in Lucknow
Educational institutions established in 1959
1959 establishments in Uttar Pradesh